Chavassery  is a small town in Kannur district in the Indian state of Kerala.

Demographics
 India census, Chavassery had a population of 20134 with 9866 males and 10268 females. Chavassery is the part of Keezur-Chaavssery Grama Panchayath extending from Palottupalli to Keezur

Transportation
Chavassery is the main town between Mattanur and Iritty. There are three bus stops in Chavassery 1. Chavassery Old PostOffice 2. Chavassery Town 3. Chavassery School Stop. Mainly two roads start from Chavassery: Chavassery-Naduvanad road and Chavassery-Veliyambra Road. The village has a wide variety of flora and fauna. Chavassery is 10 km away from KannurInternational Airport. The national highway passes through Kannur town.  Goa and Mumbai can be accessed on the northern side, and Cochin and Thiruvananthapuram can be accessed on the southern side.  The road to the east of Iritty connects to Mysore and Bangalore.  The nearest railway station is Kannur on Mangalore-Palakkad line. 

Trains are available to almost all parts of India subject to advance booking over the internet.  There are airports at Mattanur, Mangalore and Calicut. All of them are international airports, but direct flights are available only to Middle Eastern countries.

References

Villages near Kannur airport